Sebastian Schmidt may refer to:

 Sebastian Schmidt (luger) (born 1978), German luger
 Sebastian Schmidt (rower) (born 1985), German rower